Hermann Schmalzried (born January 21, 1932 in Koblenz) is a German chemist known for his work in physical chemistry, especially on the thermodynamics and kinetics of solid state chemistry.

Education and career 

Schmalzried received his diploma (with a diploma thesis on the fluorescence of benzopyrene) from Theodor Förster at the University of Stuttgart and received his doctorate in 1958 at the Roentgen Institute of the University of Stuttgart with Richard Glocker (1890-1978) and was a postdoc with Carl Wagner at the Max Planck Institute for Biophysical Chemistry in Göttingen, a pioneer in solid state chemistry. He habilitated in 1966 at the Leibniz University Hannover on the topic of disorder in ternary ionic crystals. In 1966, he became a full professor at the Technical University of Clausthal and in 1975 at the Leibniz University Hannover. He was Courtesy Professor at Cornell University and Schottky Professor at Stanford University.

He wrote two textbooks on chemical reactions in solids, which were internationally standard works. He also dealt with thermodynamics of solids and electrochemistry. His group worked closely with Alan Lidiard's group in England.

Honors and awards 

Schmalzried received the Wilhelm Jost Memorial Medal in 1994 and the Bunsen Medal in 2013. He is "External Scientific Member" of the Max Planck Institute for Biophysical Chemistry in Göttingen, member of the Göttingen Academy of Sciences, the Leopoldina, corresponding member of the Austrian Academy of Sciences and member of the Academia Europaea (1989). He was awarded an honorary doctor at the University of Stuttgart in 2003.

Bibliography

Reviews

Books

References

External links 

 Würdigung an der Universität Stuttgart anlässlich der Ehrendoktorwürde, 2004, pdf

1932 births
Corresponding Members of the Austrian Academy of Sciences
Members of the Göttingen Academy of Sciences and Humanities
Members of Academia Europaea
20th-century chemists
University of Stuttgart alumni
Academic staff of the Clausthal University of Technology
German physical chemists
20th-century German chemists
People from Koblenz
Academic staff of the University of Hanover
Members of the German Academy of Sciences Leopoldina
Solid state chemists
Living people